Meloidogyne partityla is a plant pathogenic nematode infecting pecan. One of the first described cases of this nematode where noted in pecan trees in South Africa by Brito et al. (2013). It is thought to have been introduced into South Africa by pecan seedlings that came from the United States (Eisenback, 2015). Today, this nematode is seen infecting pecan trees in Arizona, Arkansas,  Florida, Georgia, New Mexico, Oklahoma, and Texas (Eisenback, 2015). They not only infect pecans, but they also infect the California black walnut, English walnut, shagbark hickory, and laurel oak (Eisenback, 2015). The first report in the US, was reported in South Carolina in which it infected laurel oaks but later started infecting neighboring pecan trees in the shared orchards (Eisenback, 2015). 
The health of infested trees continue to decline every year (Eisenback, 2015).

See also 
 List of pecan diseases

References 

Brito, J. A., Han, H., Stanley, J. D., Hao, M., & Dickson, D. W. (2013). First Report of Laurel Oak as a Host for the Pecan Root-Knot Nematode, Meloidogyne partityla, in Florida. Plant Disease, 97(1), 151-151. doi:10.1094/pdis-02-12-0201-pdn
Eisenback, J. D., Paes-Takahashi, V. D., & Graney, L. S. (2015). First Report of the Pecan Root-Knot Nematode, Meloidogyne partityla, Causing Dieback to Laurel Oak in South Carolina. Plant Disease, 99(7), 1041-1041. doi:10.1094/pdis-11-14-1122-pdn

External links 
 Nemaplex, University of California - Meloidogyne partityla

Tylenchida
Agricultural pest nematodes
Nut tree diseases
Nematodes described in 1986